XHKN-FM is a radio station on 95.5 FM in Huetamo, Michoacán. It is owned by Grupo TREDI Radio and known as La Raza with a grupera format.

History
XEKN-AM 1490, a 250-watt daytimer, received its concession on November 15, 1969. In the 1980s, it increased power to 500 watts day and 250 night, and again to 1 kW in the 1990s.

In the early 2000s, XEKN moved to 720 kHz with 5 kW, and in 2012, it was cleared to move to FM.

References

Radio stations in Michoacán
Radio stations in Mexico with continuity obligations